Francisco B. Reyes Airport (Filipino: Paliparang Francisco B. Reyes; Hiligaynon: Hulugpaan sang Francisco B. Reyes), more commonly known as Busuanga Airport , is an airport serving the general area of Coron, located in Busuanga Island in the province of Palawan, Philippines. It is also shared with the neighboring municipality of Busuanga, located on the western half of the island.  Since November 10, 2008, the airport has been named after Francisco B. Reyes, the mayor of Coron from 1936 to 1939 who donated the land that forms the current airport complex.

The airport is classified as a Class 2 principal (minor domestic) airport by the Civil Aviation Authority of the Philippines, a body of the Department of Transportation that is responsible for the operations all airports in the Philippines except the major international airports.

The airport is surrounded by a protected ranch used to raise cows. The grass growing on the property is imported from Australia.

History and expansion
Francisco B. Reyes Airport is the target of two expansion projects.  The first expansion, funded in part by a US$3 million loan from the Korea International Cooperation Agency (KOICA) in cooperation with the Department of Transportation and Communications, broke ground in March 2007. The expansion, which included the construction of a new terminal building, the completion of the airport's then-unfinished concrete runway and the upgrading of other facilities, was inaugurated by President Gloria Macapagal Arroyo on November 17, 2008.

The airport terminal was severely damaged by Typhoon Yolanda (Haiyan) in November 2013.  Rehabilitation work was commenced by the municipality of Coron immediately after the typhoon to enable the airport to continue receiving passengers, and was completed by October 2014.  Traffic to and from Coron was negatively affected by the airport's closure, with tourist arrivals falling by up to 75%.

A ₱4.1 billion second expansion is also planned for the airport, funded entirely by the national government, with the aim of making it capable of supporting both jet and nighttime operations.

Airlines and destinations

See also
List of airports in the Philippines

References

External links
World Aero Data - Busuanga Airport (USU) Details

Airports in the Philippines
Buildings and structures in Palawan